Pleasant Goat and Big Big Wolf – Desert Trek: The Adventure of the Lost Totem, is a 2010 Chinese animated film based on the popular Pleasant Goat and Big Big Wolf TV series. It is preceded by Pleasant Goat and Big Big Wolf: The Super Snail Adventure (2009) and is followed by Moon Castle: The Space Adventure (2011).

Synopsis
Gecko Counselor and Lord Japper brutally attack the Goat Village with plans to build an amusement park. Even worse, they intend to turn the Wolf Castle, which is home to Wolffy, Wolnie and Wilie, into a public toilet! To save their captured families from the fierce animal gang and robot soldiers, Weslie and Wolffy must work together to find the legendary statues that protected their ancestors. Can they beat the villains and become friends?

Plot 
In order to commemorate the thousandth anniversary of the invention of Chinese cabbage, a party was held in the Goats Village in the evening. However at the same time, the one-thousandth anniversary of the invention of the mutton hotpot has arrived in the wolf pack, in order to achieve the goal, the wolves decided to catch the goats from Goats Village to make mutton hotpot that night. Unexpectedly, when the party started in the Goats Village, other than Wolffy, an uninvited guest appeared, and that was Lord Japper. With the rights of the president of the International Animal Council, he planned to convert the Green Green Grassland including the Goats Village into an amusement park, even the Wolf Castle was converted into a public toilet. Moreover, the residents in the Green Green Grassland were forced to work as employees of the amusement park and the residents were only given two hours to rest each day. So Weslie and Wolffy decided to look for the legendary invincible totem under the instructions of Slowy, the village chief of the Goats Village.

Theme songs
"Dajia Yiqi Xiyangyang" by Bibi Zhou
"Zuoshou Youshou" by Yang Peiyi
"Wo Ai Pingdiguo" by Ronald Cheng

Voice cast
Zu Liqing - Weslie
Deng Yuting - Tibbie / Jonie
Liang Ying - Paddi / Wilie
Liu Hongyun - Sparky
Gao Quansheng - Slowy
Zhang Lin - Wolffy
Zhao Na - Wolnie
Jia Yi - Lord Japper
Guo Yu - Gecko Counselor
Chip Tsao - Sphinx Wolf
Shi An - Sphinx Goat
Huang Xuming - Cool Leopold

Marketing

Mainland China
In order to boost the box office for the film, one of the production companies: Shanghai Media Group arranged a special marketing promotion. For those who bought the film tickets may have a chance to get a special game card and a limited edition "mystery gift", which includes a limited edition Pleasant Goat Year of the Tiger plush toy, a limited edition Big Big Wolf Year of the Tiger plush toy and the film DVD.

Hong Kong
Vinda International, a Chinese tissue paper production company co-branded with Pleasant Goat and Big Big Wolf produce tissue paper products with image of Pleasant Goat on it. Furthermore, in order to boost the sales and promote its brand, Vinda also held a Peasant Goat movie tickets lucky draw for those who bought Vinda products.

Reception
In mainland China, the box office has received over ten million Renminbi in just one day after the movie released, while it received over forty-five million Renminbi in one week.

Overall, the film had received a total revenues of 124.38 million yuan.

Although the film made a sound profit in the box office, the brand of “Pleasant Goat and Big Big Wolf” became famous over Mainland China, the main production company of the film: Creative Power Entertaining could not cover the cost as its revenue is much lower than the box office. Moreover, the sales content-based derivative products is lower than the company's expected due to lots of fake derivative products in China market and lacking copyright protection.

Awards
"Pleasant Goat and Big Big Wolf: Desert Trek: The Adventure of the Lost Totem" has won "The Best Chinese Animation Award" in the 16th "Magnolia Awards"; the film has also won the "Best Animated Feature Film Award" in "" (OACC).

References

External links

The Tiger Prowess official website 
Official Tudou film link 

2010 films
Pleasant Goat and Big Big Wolf films
Chinese animated films
2010 animated films
Films set in amusement parks
2010s Mandarin-language films